Alan Geoffrey Osborne (27 December 1933 – 4 August 1996) was an Australian rules footballer who played for the St Kilda Football Club in the Victorian Football League (VFL).

Notes

External links 

1933 births
Australian rules footballers from Victoria (Australia)
St Kilda Football Club players
Seymour Football Club players
1996 deaths